The Underground Tapes is the debut studio album by Canadian rapper Saukrates, which was released June 22, 1999 in the United States through independent labels Serious Entertainment and Capitol Hill Music. In late summer 1999, the album was re-released in Canada with six additional tracks. Production was handled by Saukrates, Mr. Attic, Mike Caren, and Day. Three songs from the album—"Innovations", "Play Dis (99 Remix)", and "Rollin"—are remixes. The only single from the album was "Money or Love", which was nominated for a Juno Award in 2000.

Mike Shinoda, the co-vocalist of Linkin Park, designed the album cover, as it was shown in the band's first documentary DVD called Frat Party at the Pankake Festival, which was released on November 20, 2001, from a short video clip entitled "Mike & Joe's Art" that can be seen from the "Special Features" menu.

Reception

Allmusic stated "Influenced by the quintessential N.Y. sound of old, Saukrates' self-produced jazzy synthesizers and organic string sections permeate with a native-tongues vibe. But it's lyrically where Saukrates distinguishes himself, as his flow and domineering habitation on the mike is utterly hypnotic."

Track listing

The Canadian re-release features six additional tracks.

Samples
"Da Professional" contains a sample of "On the Hill" by Oliver Sain
"Check for Me" contains a sample of "(If Loving You Is Wrong) I Don't Want to Be Right" by Ramsey Lewis

Personnel
Greg Barrett – mixer
Mike Caren – producer, executive producer, mixer
Choclair – performer
Heltah Skeltah – performer
Saukrates – producer, executive producer
Xzibit – performer
Common – performer
Mike Shinoda – artwork
Chase Parsons – executive producer

References

1999 debut albums
Albums produced by Saukrates
Saukrates albums